Rob Laakso is an American musician, record producer and engineer, best known as the recording partner of indie rock musician Kurt Vile, and as a multi-instrumentalist in his backing band The Violators. Laakso is also a multi-instrumentalist who has played in the shoegaze band Swirlies, among others.

After contributing to Vile's second and fourth studio albums, God Is Saying This to You... (2009) and Smoke Ring for My Halo (2011), Laakso became a full member of The Violators in 2011, following the departure of guitarist Adam Granduciel. Upon joining the band, Laakso contributed heavily to Vile's subsequent studio albums, Wakin on a Pretty Daze (2013), b'lieve I'm goin down... (2015), Bottle It In (2018) and (watch my moves) (2022).

Discography
with Kurt Vile
God Is Saying This to You... (2009)
Smoke Ring for My Halo (2011)
So Outta Reach (2011)
Wakin on a Pretty Daze (2013)
It's a Big World Out There (And I Am Scared) (2013)
b'lieve I'm goin down... (2015)
Bottle It In (2018)
(watch my moves) (2022)

with Mice Parade
Obrigado Saudade (2004)
Mice Parade (2007)
What It Means to Be Left-Handed (2010)

with Amazing Baby
Rewild (2009)

with Diamond Nights
Popsicle (2005)
Once We Were Diamonds EP (2005)

with Swirlies
Damon, Andy, Rob, Ron: The Yes Girls (2000)
Cats of the Wild Volume 2 (2003)
Swirlies' Magic Strop: Winsome Zamula's Hammer of Contumely (2005)

with The Wicked Farleys
Make It It (2000)
Sustained Interest EP (1999)
Sentinel and Enterprise (1998)

References

Living people
American rock guitarists
American multi-instrumentalists
American record producers
American audio engineers
Year of birth missing (living people)